Agni Poolu is a 1981 Indian Telugu-language drama film directed by K. Bapayya and produced by D. Ramanaidu. The film stars Krishnam Raju, Jaya Prada, Jayasudha, Jayanthi, Sarath Babu, Sudhakar and Kaikala Satyanarayana. It was based on Yaddanapudi Sulochana Rani's novel of the same name.

Cast 
 Krishnam Raju as Virupaksha Raja & Krishna Chaitanya (Dual role)
 Jaya Prada as Rukmini
 Jayasudha as Janaki "Jany"
 Jayanthi as Rajeshwari
 Satyanayana as Vishwam
 Gummadi as Rajeshwari's father
 Nirmalamma as Annapurna
 Sreedhar as Prasad
 Sarath Babu as Rahul
 Sudhakar as Bobby Shivam
 R. Narayana Murthy as Raju
 Subhashini as Neeli
 Allu Rama Lingaiah

Soundtrack 
K. V Mahadevan
Singers: S. P. Balasubrahmanyan, P. Susheela
1
"Abbai Abbai Nuvventha"
2
"Priyudaa Paraaka
3
"Vayasu Kothi Vantidi"
4
"Idi Whisky-Adi Brandy

Reception

References

External links 

1981 films
Films based on Indian novels
Indian drama films
Films directed by K. Bapayya
Films scored by K. V. Mahadevan
Films based on novels by Yaddanapudi Sulochana Rani
Indian films about revenge
1980s Telugu-language films
1981 drama films
Suresh Productions films